Jean Léonard Barrié, (28 February 1762 in Saint-Béat, Haute-Garonne − 15 February 1848 in Toulouse) was a French general of the Napoleonic era.

Biography

From volunteer to Chief of Brigade

He entered the army as a volunteer on 21 September 1792 in the 1st Saint-Gaudens Battalion and became a captain on 28 October following. 

Barons of the First French Empire
Knights of the Order of Saint Louis
Commandeurs of the Légion d'honneur
First French Empire brigadier generals of 1810